Sagra purpurea is a species of beetles belonging to the family Chrysomelidae.

Description
These beetles have a striking sexual dimorphism. The males are much larger and have very long and strong hind legs. The basic color is quite variable, but usually it is metallic reddish.

Distribution
This species can be found in the forests of China, India and Vietnam.

References
 Organism Names
 Encyclopaedia of Life
 Zipcodezoo
 Shinsaku Kimoto and J. L.  Gressitt  CHRYSOMELIDAE (COLEOPTERA) OF THAILAND, CAMBODIA, LAOS AND VIETNAM

Chrysomelidae
Beetles described in 1795